The University of the East College of Dentistry was first established as a unit of the Philippine College of Commerce and Business Administration in 1948. The college is one of the pioneers of dental education and labeled as one of the top dental schools in the Philippines.

The University of the East College of Dentistry ranked No. 1 in among dental schools based on the results of the June 2009 Dentist Licensure Examination released recently by the Professional Regulation Commission’s (PRC) Board of Dentistry. Achieving a passing percentage of 98%.

Rankings

The University of the East College of Dentistry ranked No. 1 in among dental schools based on the results of the December 2007 Dentist Licensure Examination released recently by the Professional Regulation Commission’s (PRC) Board of Dentistry. Achieving a passing percentage of 86%.

Four UE College of Dentistry (UECD) fresh graduates clinched 2nd, 5th, 6th and 10th places in the June 2009 Dentist Licensure Examination. UECD achieved a 98% passing percentage with 57 successful examinees out of 58, garnering No. 1 status at the 29-99 examinees category, maintaining its rank as the No. 1 performing school in Dentistry. This 98% passing percentage, higher by more than 100% than the 45.38% national overall passing percentage, is UECD’s highest passing percentage in ten (10) years, resulting to 3 consecutive years of UECD posting more than 90% passing rate.

Curricular Offerings

 Doctor of Dental Medicine, DMD
 Two Years Pre-Dentistry Program (Associate in Health Science Education)

the University also offers four master of Science in Dentistry courses to qualified local and foreign students.

The Masters program is available as one of the following:
Periodontics
Orthodontics
Prosthodontics
Endodontics

Foreign Migration

A study published in the Journal of American Dental Association showed that UE College of Dentistry sent the highest number of candidates seeking licensure to practice in the United States between 2002-2005. According to the American Dental Association's Department of Testing Services, a total 169 out of 1270 foreign-trained dentists who took the National Board Dental Examination Part II (U.S. dental licensure exam) were from UE College of Dentistry.

See also
University of the East

References

External links
University of the East
 University of the East College of Dentistry

Dentistry
Dental schools in the Philippines